The 2022–23 Inverness Caledonian Thistle season is the club's 29th campaign in the SPFL, and the club's sixth consecutive season in the Scottish Championship after narrowly missing out on promotion, being defeated 6–2 on aggregate in the Premiership Play-Off Finals by St Johnstone.

Fixtures and Results

Friendlies

League

Scottish Cup

League Cup

Challenge Cup

Team Statistics

League Standings

First Team Player Statistics 
As of 10 March 2023, vs Kilmarnock.

League Goalscorers

Overall Goalscorers 

*players in italics left the club during the season

Hat-tricks

Transfers

References 

2022-23_Inverness Caledonian Thistle F.C. season
Inverness_Caledonian_Thistle_F.C._season_2022-23